Ossie "The Ghanaian Gladiator" Duran (born 23 April 1977) is a Ghanaian professional boxer, whose career has spanned over 3 decades (1990's/2000's/2010's).

He has won the Ghanaian lightweight title, World Boxing Federation (WBF) Pan-European welterweight title, WBF European Welterweight Title, United States Boxing Association (USBA) Atlantic Coast Region middleweight title, Commonwealth welterweight title, and Commonwealth light middleweight title, drew with Eromosele Albert  for the vacant International Boxing Federation (IBF) Continental Africa light middleweight title, and was a challenger for the Commonwealth lightweight title against David Tetteh, World Boxing Organization (WBO) North American Boxing Organization (NABO) middleweight title against Fernando Guerrero, and World Boxing Council (WBC) Silver middleweight title against Avtandil Khurtsidze.

He is trained by Lenny DeJesus.

References

External links

Image - Ossie Duran

1977 births
Light-middleweight boxers
Lightweight boxers
Light-welterweight boxers
Living people
Middleweight boxers
Boxers from Accra
Super-middleweight boxers
Welterweight boxers
Ghanaian male boxers